David Alistair Shand (born August 11, 1956) is a Canadian former professional ice hockey defenceman. Drafted in 1976 by both the Atlanta Flames of the National Hockey League and the Calgary Cowboys of the World Hockey Association, Shand also played for the Toronto Maple Leafs and Washington Capitals.

Hockey career
Shand was born in Cold Lake, Alberta and raised in Portage la Prairie, Manitoba. As a youth, he played in the 1967 and 1968 Quebec International Pee-Wee Hockey Tournaments with a minor ice hockey team from Borden, Saskatchewan. He was selected in the first round of the 1976 NHL Amateur Draft by the Atlanta Flames, as the eighth overall pick.

On April 1, 1978, he tied the Flames franchise single-game record (since broken) for assists in one game with four, versus the New York Rangers. He had previously tied the Flames franchise single-game record (since broken) with three assists in a period, versus the Rangers on January 20, 1978. Shand missed the start of 1984-85 season with a cracked sinus bone and facial laceration, suffered when he was hit below his left eye by a Scott Stevens shot during Washington's 1984 training camp. He retired from hockey in 1989.

Post-playing career
Dave Shand was an assistant coach for the University of Michigan men's hockey team under head coach Red Berenson from 1989 to 1993. During his tenure as assistant coach, the team went to three straight Frozen Four college hockey tournaments.

Shand holds several degrees, including a Juris Doctor degree from the University of Michigan. Shand has also taught sports law at the university's division of Kinesiology.

Shand hosted In The Locker Room, a morning drive radio show on WTKA out of Ann Arbor, Michigan until April 23, 2007. Shand's commentaries and his life's stories were featured regularly during the radio show.

According to Michigan football blog MVictors.com, Shand was fired from WTKA because he criticized the University of Michigan, and the athletic director of the university threatened to pull coverage of Michigan football from the radio station unless he was fired.

Following his departure from WTKA, Shand began practicing law. He is well known in Michigan as a prominent attorney in private practice.

Career statistics

Regular season and playoffs

International

References

External links

Profile at hockeydraftcentral.com

1956 births
Living people
Atlanta Flames draft picks
Atlanta Flames players
Calgary Cowboys draft picks
Canadian ice hockey defencemen
Hershey Bears players
Ice hockey people from Alberta
Sportspeople from Portage la Prairie
Michigan Wolverines men's ice hockey players
National Hockey League first-round draft picks
New Brunswick Hawks players
Nova Scotia Voyageurs players
People from Cold Lake, Alberta
Toronto Maple Leafs players
University of Michigan Law School alumni
Washington Capitals players
Ice hockey people from Manitoba